Mecyclothorax ambiguus is a species of ground beetle in the subfamily Psydrinae. It was described by Wilhelm Ferdinand Erichson in 1842.

References

ambiguus
Beetles described in 1842
Beetles of New Zealand